The Stockbridge House, in Colorado Springs, Colorado, was built in 1891.  It was listed on the National Register of Historic Places in 1980.  It has also been known as the Amarillo Motel.

References

Houses on the National Register of Historic Places in Colorado
Houses completed in 1891
Buildings and structures in Colorado Springs, Colorado
Houses in El Paso County, Colorado
National Register of Historic Places in Colorado Springs, Colorado